Filippos Mavros (January 24, 1921 - December 22, 2016) was a Greek politician from Kastellorizo. He was the youngest son of Ioannis Mavros and brother of Georgios Mavros. He worked as a merchant and made his debut in politics in 1961, when he was elected as a Member of Parliament with the Centre Union in the Athens B electoral district. He was reelected in 1963 and 1964 with the Centre Union. He was again elected in the period 1974-1977 with the party of his brother, Centre Union – New Forces, later known as the Union of the Democratic Centre, in the Former Municipality of Athens–Remainder district. He was married with Lydia Papathanasiou with whom he had three daughters.

References
 

1921 births
2016 deaths
Greek MPs 1961–1963
Greek MPs 1963–1964
Greek MPs 1964–1967
Greek MPs 1974–1977
Centre Union politicians
Centre Union – New Forces politicians
People from Kastellorizo